A Faraday balance is a device for measuring magnetic susceptibility. Magnetic susceptibility is  related to the force experienced by a substance in a magnetic field. Various practical devices are available for the measurement of susceptibility, which differ in the shape of the magnetic field and the way the force is measured.

In the Faraday balance the field is homogeneous. The pole pieces of the magnet are so shaped that there is a region in which the product of the field strength and field gradient in the z direction is constant. The sample is placed in this region. The force in this case is independent of the packing of the sample and depends only on the total mass of the material present. The method is sensitive and highly reproducible and can be applied to single crystals. The force is measured as a weight change, using a torsion balance.

An alternative method for measuring magnetic susceptibility is the Gouy balance. In this technique there is an inhomogeneous field in the central region between two (flat) poles of a permanent magnet, or an electromagnet. The sample, in the form of a powder in a cylindrical tube, is suspended in such a way the one end lies in the centre of the field and the other is effectively outside the magnetic field. Errors due to inefficient packing in the sample tube are difficult to eliminate.

References 

Magnetic devices